Nové Mitrovice is a municipality and village in Plzeň-South District in the Plzeň Region of the Czech Republic. It has about 300 inhabitants. The folk architecture in the village of Mítov within the municipality is well preserved and is protected by law as a village monument zone.

Administrative parts
Villages of Mítov, Nechanice and Planiny are administrative parts of Nové Mitrovice.

Geography
The western part of the municipal territory lies in the Švihov Highlands. The Mítovský Stream flows through the municipality.

History
The first written mention of Nové Mitrovice is from 1626. At that time, it was a small hamlet called "Hutě", which consisted of 8 cottages and was administered as part of Železný Újezd. From the first half of the 17th century, iron ore was mined in the area. At the end of the 17th century, silver was also mined for a short time. In 1708, the name of "Nové Mitrovice" was mentioned for the first time. The village was renamed after tits owners, the noble family of Wratislaw of Mitrovice. The family further developed the mining and iron-processing industry, luring many German immigrants.

After the World War II, the municipality of Mítov was merged with Nové Mitrovice. Planiny was incorporated in 1621 and Nechanice in 1976.

Demographics

Sight
The Church of Saint John of Nepomuk was built in the Baroque style in 1722–1726. It was most likely designed by Jakub Auguston.

References

External links

Villages in Plzeň-South District